Ousmane Berthé (born 5 February 1987) is a Malian professional footballer who plays as a defender for Dhaka Mohammedan.

Club career
In July 2008, Berthé joined Jomo Cosmos in the South African Premier Soccer League. Berthé played his 1st game on 8 August 2009, for Jomo Cosmos against Platinum Stars, playing 66 minutes before being substituted, the match ended 0–0.

References

1987 births
Living people
Malian footballers
Mali international footballers
2010 Africa Cup of Nations players
2012 Africa Cup of Nations players
Jomo Cosmos F.C. players
JS Centre Salif Keita players
CS Constantine players
Algerian Ligue Professionnelle 1 players
Expatriate soccer players in South Africa
Expatriate footballers in Algeria
Sportspeople from Bamako
Association football defenders
Muaither SC players
Qatari Second Division players
21st-century Malian people